The 2024 U Sports Women's Volleyball Championship is scheduled to be held March 15–17, 2024, in Hamilton, Ontario, to determine a national champion for the 2023–24 U Sports women's volleyball season.

Host
The tournament is scheduled to be played at McMaster University at the Burridge Gymnasium on the school's campus. This would be the third time that McMaster has hosted the tournament with the most recent occurring in 2012.

Scheduled teams
Canada West Representative
OUA Representative
RSEQ Representative
AUS Representative
Host (McMaster Marauders)
Three additional berths

Championship bracket

Consolation bracket

References

External links 
 Tournament Web Site

U Sports volleyball
2024 in women's volleyball
McMaster University